Tanya (1902–1929) was an American Thoroughbred racehorse bred and raised in Kentucky. She was bred by William Collins Whitney and foaled at his Brookdale Farm in Lincroft, New Jersey. Sired by the outstanding English stallion Meddler, she was out of the mare Handspun.

Before Tanya could set foot on a track, William Whitney died.  She, along with several other racers for the Whitney stable, was leased to Herman Duryea. As a 2-year-old, she won the Hopeful Stakes, the National Stallion Stakes, and the Spinaway Stakes under his colors.

1905 Belmont Stakes
Tanya is best known as one of three fillies to win the Belmont Stakes.  Purchased for $7,000 by Whitney's son, Harry Payne Whitney, Tanya was trained by future Hall of Fame inductee John W. Rogers. Ridden by the 1904 U. S. Champion Jockey Gene Hildebrand, on May 24, 1905, the filly won the Belmont Stakes in its first running at the new Belmont Park. She beat second-place finisher Blandy and her half-brother Hot Shot, another Meddler colt, who came in third in a time of 2:08 3/5.  The Belmont Stakes distance was one mile and a quarter in 1905.
Tanya was the second filly in history to win the Belmont Stakes, after Ruthless won the inaugural race in 1867. The race would not be won by another filly for more than a century, when Rags to Riches won the race in 2007.

Pedigree

See also
 List of historical horses

External links
 Tanya

References
 Portraits Tanya
 Belmont Stakes Info
 Tanya's pedigree and partial racing stats
 Details of all past Belmont Stakes

1902 racehorse births
1929 racehorse deaths
Racehorses bred in New Jersey
Racehorses trained in the United States
American Champion racehorses
Belmont Stakes winners
Thoroughbred family 11